The Schistosomatoidea are a superfamily of digenetic trematodes.

Families
Aporocotylidae Odhner, 1912
Schistosomatidae Stiles & Hassall, 1898
Spirorchiidae Stunkard, 1921

References

Animal superfamilies
Diplostomida